Raymond Joseph (Ray) McGrath (born March 27, 1942) is an American educator and politician who served six terms as a member of the United States House of Representatives from 1981 to 1983. He was a Republican from New York.

Biography 
McGrath was born in Valley Stream, New York. He graduated from the State University of New York at Brockport in 1963 and received an M.A. from New York University in 1968. Then he taught biology.

Political career 
From 1965 to 1971, he also served as Commissioner of the Hempstead Parks and Recreation Bureau.

He was a member of the New York State Assembly from 1977 to 1980, sitting in the 182nd and 183rd New York State Legislatures.

Congress 
He was elected as a Republican to the 97th, 98th, 99th, 100th, 101st and 102nd United States Congresses, holding office from January 3, 1981, to January 3, 1993.

Later career 
Afterwards he became the president of the Beer Institute.

He is currently President of the Downey McGrath Group Inc. in Washington, D.C.

External links
 
 

1942 births
State University of New York at Brockport alumni
New York University alumni
Living people
People from Long Island
Republican Party members of the New York State Assembly
Republican Party members of the United States House of Representatives from New York (state)
American chief operating officers
Members of Congress who became lobbyists